Sugden refers to:

Persons
 David E. Sugden, British glaciologist and geomorphologist
 Edward Sugden (methodist) (1854–1935), Methodist minister, first master of Queen's College, University of Melbourne
 Edward Sugden, 1st Baron St Leonards (1781–1875), British jurist and politician
 John Sugden (died 1897), English bishop
 Mark Sugden (1902–1990), Irish rugby union player
 Mollie Sugden (1922–2009), English comedy actress
 Philip Sugden (artist), (born 1949), English artist
 Philip Sugden (historian), (1947–2014), English historian
 Richard Sugden (1871–1951), British army officer
 Robert Sugden (economist) (born 1949), English economist
 Ronald Sugden (1896–1971), English cricketer and Royal Air Force officer
 Tim Sugden (born 1964), British racing driver

Fictional characters
 The Sugden family, a family in the British soap opera Emmerdale

Places
 Sugden, Oklahoma, USA

Other uses
 Sugden Audio, British Hi-fi and audio equipment manufacturer